James Creighton may refer to:

 Jim Creighton (1841–1862), baseball player
 James Creighton (ice hockey) (1850–1930), Canadian ice hockey pioneer from Nova Scotia
 James Edwin Creighton (1861–1924), American philosopher
 James Forbes Creighton (1879–1944), physician and politician in Saskatchewan, Canada
 Jimmy Creighton (1905–1990), ice hockey player
 James M. Creighton (1856–1946), American architect in Arizona
 Jim Creighton (basketball) (born 1950), American basketball player